The Pheasant Breeding Centre, Berwala is a purpose-built centre for the breeding of pheasants situated in Berwala in Panchkula district.

Description
Several types of pheasants are bred, including red junglefowl (Gallus gallus), endangered cheer pheasant (Catreus wallichii) and endangered kalij pheasant. The centre has a program for breeding and releasing birds into the wild.

References

Panchkula district
Animal breeding organisations in India
Protected areas with year of establishment missing
Organisations based in Haryana
Protected areas of Haryana